Leon Neal (born September 11, 1972) was a running back at the University of Washington.  He was drafted by the Buffalo Bills in the 1996 NFL Draft, but played for the Indianapolis Colts.

High school
Neal attended Paramount High School in Paramount, California.

College
Neal played for the Washington Huskies from 1991 to 1995 for coaches Don James and Jim Lambright.  Neal and six teammates, "The Medford Seven," were severely injured in an automobile accident while travelling home to California during winter break in 1991.  Neal primarily served as a backup to Napoleon Kaufman, until starting his senior season in 1995.

References

1972 births
Living people
Players of American football from Saint Paul, Minnesota
American football running backs
Washington Huskies football players
Indianapolis Colts players